In enzymology, a diphthine—ammonia ligase (diphthamide synthase, diphthamide synthetase) is an enzyme that catalyzes the chemical reaction

ATP + diphthine + NH3  ADP + phosphate + diphthamide

The 3 substrates of this enzyme are ATP, diphthine, and NH3, whereas its 3 products are ADP, phosphate, and diphthamide.

This enzyme belongs to the family of ligases, specifically those forming carbon-nitrogen bonds as acid-D-amino-acid ligases (peptide synthases).  The systematic name of this enzyme class is diphthine:ammonia ligase (ADP-forming). Other names in common use include diphthamide synthase, and diphthamide synthetase.

References

 
 

EC 6.3.2
Enzymes of unknown structure